My Own Land (sometimes translated as Our Native Land), Op. 92, is a single-movement cantata for mixed choir and orchestra written in 1918 by the Finnish composer Jean Sibelius. My Own Land premiered on 25 October 1918 in Helsinki with  conducting the Helsinki Youth League (the predecessor to the Finnish National Chorus)—the commissioning ensemble and dedicatee—and the Helsinki Philharmonic Orchestra.

Orchestration 
My Own Land is scored for the following instruments and voices:
Vocalists: Mixed choir (SATB)
Woodwinds: 2 flutes, 2 oboes, 2 clarinets (in B), and 2 bassoons
Brass: 4 horns (in F), 2 trumpets (in B), and 3 trombones
Percussion: timpani and glockenspiel
Strings: violins, violas, cellos, double basses

History 

The cantata resulted from a commission by the "Helsinki Youth League", a youth choir that eventually became the Finnish National Chorus; the ensemble desired from Sibelius a new work that it could perform in 1918 to celebrate its tenth anniversary. Sibelius at the time was staying in Helsinki at Lapinlahti (the hospital at which his brother, Christian, was the medical superintendent), having abandoned Ainola as a precaution in mid-February due to risks associated with the Finnish Civil War. (On 28 January, the Soviet-aided Reds had taken the capital and established a socialist state; on 12–13 February, they had searched the home of Sibelius, who was a known White sympathizer.)

The war led to food shortages and inflation, and Sibelius desperately needed money. It was in these "inauspicious circumstances" that he agreed composed the new cantata (as Sibelius's biographer, Erik Tawaststjerna, notes: "What other course was there but to borrow or beg—and compose?"), although the National Chorus offered him a mere 1,000 Finnish marks, which the composer was to return upon selling the cantata to a publisher. (In his diary, Sibelius grumbled: "In other words, they get it for nothing. But I haven't the heart to say no".)

Sibelius chose to set the poem  (1832) by the Finnish poet Kallio (a pseudonym for Samuli Kustaa Bergh), which had become dear to him during the war. It is a patriotic text—one of "finest achievements of Finnish lyrical poetry", pre-Kivi—that speaks of one's longing for Finland and references Finnish mythology. For example, in the first stanza, Kallio writes:

Indeed, Sibelius spoke of his composition as a "song of praise to nature and the white nights of Finland".

Sibelius completed the cantata in late March 1918, around the time that the Whites retook Helsinki. (The civil war subsequently ended in May.) The piece premiered months later on 25 October 1918 in Helsinki, with the Finnish composer  conducting the National Chorus—its dedicatee—and the Helsinki Philharmonic Orchestra. Sibelius was in attendance, a trip that had cost him about 5,000 marks. (As he recorded on 29 October in his daiary: "Begin to compose small pieces to refill the coffers. Can't understand myself. Got back my old appetite and let things go".) The critics gave the cantata mixed reviews:  praised the piece as a "convincing expression for the beauty of Finland", while Leevi Madetoja (Sibelius's former pupil) thought that "the many-faceted orchestral texture could... have been given with greater clarity".

A few modern-day commentators, however, have found much to like in My Own Land. For example, Guy Rickards has labeled the cantata a "minor masterpiece", although it "does not sound particularly Finnish in character". Vesa Sirén has described the cantata as "confident and free from the most defiant patriotism. It is as if Sibelius was already trying to lead the divided nation towards a more moderate future". Finally, describing the late cantatas as a whole, Pierre-Yves Lascar argues that they "demonstrate more talent than genuine inspiration... rarely if ever [do they] equal the genius of the symphonies or the symphonic poems"; nevertheless, they "charm the listener" and are "beautiful works".

Discography 
The sortable table below lists all commercially available recordings of My Own Land:

Notes, references, and sources

Notes

References

Sources

External links 
 

Cantatas
Compositions by Jean Sibelius
1918 compositions